Man-hee, also spelled Man-hui, is a Korean unisex given name. Its meaning differs based on the hanja used to write each syllable of the name. There are 19 hanja with the reading "man" and 24 hanja with the reading "hee" on the South Korean government's official list of hanja which may be registered for use in given names.

People with this name include:
Lee Man-hee (born 1931), South Korean religious leader
Lee Man-hee (film director) (born 1931), South Korean film director
Ban Hyo-jung (born Ban Man-hee, 1942), South Korean actress
Choi Man-hee (born 1956), South Korean football player

See also
List of Korean given names

References

Korean unisex given names